Cotterell may refer to:

People
Cotterell baronets, a title in the Baronetage of the United Kingdom
Harry Cotterell (1845–1925), an English Merchant in colonial Nigeria
John Cotterell (disambiguation)
Reg Butler (1913–1981), English sculptor

Other uses
Cotterell Court, a multi-purpose arena in Hamilton, New York
Cotterell Township, Dodge County, Nebraska
Frampton Cotterell, a village in South Gloucestershire

See also 
 Cottrill (disambiguation)